An international non-governmental organization (INGO) is an organization which is independent of government involvement and extends the concept of a non-governmental organization (NGO) to an international scope. 

NGOs are independent of governments and can be seen as two types: advocacy NGOs, which aim to influence governments with a specific goal, and operational NGOs, which provide services. Examples of NGO mandates are environmental preservation, human rights promotions or the advancement of women. NGOs are typically not-for-profit, but receive funding from companies or membership fees. Many large INGOs have components of operational projects and advocacy initiatives working together within individual countries.

The technical term "international organizations" describes intergovernmental organizations (IGOs) and includes groups such as the United Nations or the International Labour Organization, which are formed by treaties among sovereign states. In contrast, INGOs are defined as "any internationally operating organization which is not established by inter-governmental agreement".

An INGO may be founded by private philanthropy, such as the Carnegie, Rockefeller, Gates and Ford Foundations, or as an adjunct to existing international organizations, such as the Catholic or Lutheran churches. A surge in INGOs for economic development occurred during World War II, some of which would later become large organizations like SOS Children's Villages, Oxfam, Catholic Relief Services, Care International and Lutheran World Relief. The number of INGOs grew from 6,000 in 1990 to 26,000 in 1999, and a 2013 report estimated about 40,000.

Except for incorporation under national laws, no current formal legal status exists for INGOs, which can lead to complications in international law.

History
In 1910, the Union of International Associations (UIA) were the first to suggest that a "super-national" status be given to international organizations with diplomatic intentions without governmental influence. The International Law Association (ILA) modified this, adding that this "super-national" organizational status may be adopted for associations formed for no profit.

Activities
The main focus of INGOs is to provide relief and developmental aid to developing countries. Health-related projects such as HIV/AIDS awareness, prevention and treatment, clean water, and malaria prevention—and education-related projects such as schools for girls and providing books—help to provide the social services that the country's government does not provide. International non-governmental organizations are some of the first responders to natural disasters, like hurricanes and floods, or crises that need emergency relief. Other organizations, like the International Justice Mission, are working to make judicial systems more effective and legitimate. Still others, such as those promoting micro-finance and education, directly impact citizens and communities by developing skills and human capital while encouraging citizen empowerment and community involvement.

NGOs, in general, account for over 15% of total international development aid, which is linked to economic development.  As of 2007, aid (partly contributed to by INGOs) over the past thirty years is estimated to have increased the annual growth rate of the bottom billion by one percent.

Criticisms

Given they are usually supported by donations, a popular concern about INGOs is where the money goes and whether it is spent efficiently. High administrative costs can be an indication of inefficiency, enrichment of employees at the expense of beneficiaries, embezzlement or misdirection of funds to corrupt local officials or dictatorship. Numerous attempts have been made to remedy the accountability of INGOs surrounding where and for what their money is being used. Websites like Charity Navigator and GiveWell attempt to provide transparency as to how much goes to administrative costs, what activities money is spent on, whether more donations would be helpful, and how cost-effective the activities are compared to other charities or potential activities.

Another criticism is that many of the people benefiting from INGOs have no way to influence those activities and hold the organizations accountable. (for example by threatening to withhold donations). Some charitable organizations solicit the participation of local communities to avoid problems related to intercultural competence, and avoid unintended consequences due to lack of buy-in or lack of knowledge about local conditions.

In March 2015, the European Journal of International Relations criticized the impact of INGOs on government decision-making, claiming they are slowing integration of developing countries into the global economy.

Notable international NGOs

Multiple interdisciplinary projects
ActionAid
ACTED
ADRA
AIESEC
CAFOD
CARE
 CRS

Cuso International
Danish Refugee Council
Islamic Relief
Koyamada International Foundation
Mercy Corps
Narayan Seva Sansthan
Oxfam
Save the Children
SOS Children's Villages
Tzu Chi Foundation
World Vision International
Plan International
Good Neighbors International

Health

Amref Health Africa
Doctors Without Borders

GAVI
The Global Fund to Fight AIDS, Tuberculosis and Malaria

Children and youth
Compassion International
International Federation of Catholic Parochial Youth Movements (FIMCAP)
Plan
Reggio Children Foundation
Save the Children International
SOS Children's Villages
World Association of Girl Guides and Girl Scouts (WAGGGS)
World Organization of the Scout Movement (WOSM)
World Vision International
AIESEC

Education
European Association of History Educators
Junior Achievement
The Library Project
OpenmindProjects- INGO

Human rights
International Rescue Committee
Human Rights Watch
Amnesty International
Commonwealth Human Rights Initiative
Friends of Peoples Close to Nature
Humanists International
International Christian Concern
International Commission against the Death Penalty
International Federation for Human Rights
Survival International

Environmental
Greenpeace
International POPs Elimination Network
International Union for Conservation of Nature
World Wide Fund for Nature

Multilateralism
Sister Cities International
World Federation of United Nations Associations

Religion
International Federation of Catholic Parochial Youth Movements (FIMCAP)
Lutheran World Relief

Space and technology
COSPAR
RIPE NCC
IMIRAD

See also
European Convention on the Recognition of the Legal Personality of International Non-Governmental Organizations
Foundation (non-profit)
International Non-Governmental Organisations Accountability Charter
Nonprofit organization
Think tank
World Polity Theory

References

Further reading
 Atack Iain 1998. "Four Criteria of Development NGO Legitimacy," in World Development 27(5), pp. 855–864.
 Collier, Paul 2007. "Aid to the Rescue?," in The Bottom Billion: Why the Poorest Countries are Failing and What Can Be Done About It, pp. 99–123. Oxford and New York: Oxford University Press.
 
 Singer, Peter 2009. "How Can You Tell Which Charities Do It Best?," in The Life You Can Save, pp. 82–125. New York: Random House.